Tennessee's 13th Senate district is one of 33 districts in the Tennessee Senate. It has been represented by Republican Dawn White since 2018, succeeding fellow Republican Bill Ketron.

Geography
District 13 is based in Murfreesboro, including most of the city proper as well as Smyrna and La Vergne in western Rutherford County.

The district is located entirely within Tennessee's 4th congressional district, and overlaps with the 34th, 37th, 48th, and 49th districts of the Tennessee House of Representatives.

Recent election results
Tennessee Senators are elected to staggered four-year terms, with odd-numbered districts holding elections in midterm years and even-numbered districts holding elections in presidential years.

2018

2014

Federal and statewide results in District 13

References 

13
Rutherford County, Tennessee